The riserless research vessel JOIDES Resolution (Joint Oceanographic Institutions for Deep Earth Sampling), often referred to as the JR, is one of the scientific drilling ships used by the International Ocean Discovery Program (IODP), an international, multi-drilling platform research program. The JR was previously the main research ship used during the Ocean Drilling Program (ODP) and was used along with the Japanese drilling vessel Chikyu and other mission-specific drilling platforms throughout the Integrated Ocean Drilling Program. She is the successor of Glomar Challenger.

The ship was first launched in 1978 as Sedco/BP 471, an oil exploration vessel. It was converted for scientific use 6 years later in 1984 and began working as the main research ship for ODP in January 1985. The JR was modernized during 2007–2008 and returned to active service in February 2009 following an extensive renovation of her laboratory facilities and quarters.

Texas A&M University (TAMU) acts as manager and science operator of the JR as a research facility for IODP. The JOIDES Resolution Science Operator (JRSO) is funded through a cooperative agreement with the US National Science Foundation (NSF), with international contributions from 23 Program member countries.

Naming 
The JOIDES Resolution is named after HMS Resolution, in which Captain James Cook made his second and third voyages of exploration in the Pacific in the 1770s.

JOIDES Resolution capabilities 
The JOIDES Resolution employs wireline coring and logging techniques to recover sequences of core and geophysical data from beneath the seafloor. The longest drill string deployment was  while drilling in  water depth.

Onboard facilities 
The JOIDES Resolution is a state-of-the-art “floating Earth science laboratory” equipped with analytical equipment, software, and databases that allow shipboard scientists to conduct research at sea as soon as cores are recovered. Virtual 360° tours of laboratory areas and a flyover video of the ship are available online [see External links.]

Laboratories 
The laboratory space includes facilities for visually describing core at the macro- and microscale; microscopes for petrological sediment analysis and biostratigraphic assessment; instrumentation for measuring physical properties, paleomagnetism, and the geochemistry of pore waters, sediment, and rocks; and equipment for cutting and sectioning samples from rock and sediment cores. The downhole measurements laboratory is used as a staging and data-acquisition area for obtaining in situ records of subseafloor formation properties ranging from borehole well logs to formation temperature and pressure.

Other facilities 
In addition to laboratories and technical resources, the JOIDES Resolution contains a conference room, offices, cabins (berths) for members of the crew and science parties, and a hospital, galley, and mess hall. A gym, movie room, and lounge with a small library are also provided.

Technical advances 
The capabilities of the JOIDES Resolution and the tools and techniques used to address science objectives have been continually improved during the life span of the scientific ocean drilling program. Key recent operational innovations include development of a half-length advanced piston corer (HLAPC) and the drill-in-casing and hydraulic release tool (HRT).

Half-length advanced piston corer
The HLAPC takes a  core rather than a standard  APC core. It was designed to potentially extend the depth of piston core penetration, allowing collection of cores suitable for high-resolution paleoceanography and paleoclimatology from greater depths. The HLAPC was also the only coring tool to successfully recover unconsolidated sands from the Bengal Fan (Expedition 354) and in other environments where the lithology has proven difficult to recover using either the APC or extended core barrel (XCB) tools.

Drill-in-casing and hydraulic release tool
Deep sediment holes, including those that penetrate basement rock below sediments, traditionally have required pre-drilling a deep hole and installing double and triple casing strings to stabilize the upper hole, requiring as long as 7–10 days. Starting in 2014 on Expedition 352, the approach of drilling-in a single casing string and reentry system with a mud motor and underreamer without pre-drilling a hole has resulted in casing the upper part of a hole in a shorter time (3–4 days). In 2015, a hydraulic release tool (HRT) was adapted to drill-in a reentry system with a short casing string to start a hole in bare rock seafloor at Southwest Indian Ridge (Expedition 360). The HRT and related hardware is now the standard drill-in casing system to establish a single casing string for deep sediment penetration.

JOIDES Resolution science operations
Scientific ocean drilling allows researchers to access the records of millions of years of Earth's climatic, biological, chemical, and geological history that are buried beneath the ocean floor. Advances in our understanding of Earth's past can help us to better understand and predict its future, and can inform decision-making about important environmental issues facing society today.

JOIDES Resolution Science Operator
The JR is managed and operated by the JRSO, which is based at TAMU. TAMU has been science operator to the JR since 1983, managing the ODP from 1983 to 2003, partnering with the Consortium for Ocean Leadership and Lamont-Doherty Earth Observatory of Columbia University to co-manage the Integrated Ocean Drilling Program from 2004 to 2013, and managing the IODP from 2013 to present. In October 2014, the JOIDES Resolution Science Operator was formalized as the implementing organization for IODP. JRSO responsibilities include overseeing the JR’s science operations; archiving data, samples, and logs collected by the current program; and producing and publicizing program publications, including expedition results, program plans, and fiscal reports.

The IODP Science Plan
With input from hundreds of international scientists, long-range science plans are developed to guide multidisciplinary international collaboration on scientific ocean drilling. These plans comprise a set of critical scientific questions that require drilling deep below the ocean floor. The IODP Science Plan for 2013–2023, Illuminating Earth's Past, Present, and Future, focuses on challenges in four areas.

• Climate and ocean change: reading the past, informing the future

• Biosphere frontiers: deep life, biodiversity, and environmental forcing of ecosystems

• Earth connections: deep processes and their impact on Earth's surface environment

• Earth in motion: processes and hazards on human time scales

The themes and challenges outlined in the IODP Science Plan are addressed by drilling expeditions that result from peer-reviewed proposals that are evaluated by the Science Evaluation Panel and an external review committee. The highest priority proposals are forwarded to the JOIDES Resolution Facility Board (JRFB), which then works with the JRSO to set an expedition schedule that most efficiently and effectively achieves the proposals’ objectives. The JRFB and NSF review and approve the JRSO Annual Program Plans, which comprise tasks and budget requests in support of the scheduled expeditions.

Optimized expedition scheduling
The JRSO and the JRFB have worked together to set a regional ship track, communicating to the science community the planned areas for JR operations in future years. As a result of this regional planning, the JR has been able to address several science plan themes on multiple, complementary expeditions. For example, Expeditions 350, 351, and 352, as well as Expedition 371 addressed the fundamental question of how the subduction process initiates. Likewise, two years of drilling in the western Pacific and Indian Oceans resulted in multiple expeditions that address the origin and initiation of the Monsoon climate system. Four planned drilling expeditions in the Antarctic and Southern Ocean will improve our understanding of how the Antarctic Ice Sheet responds to climatic forcing. These groups of expeditions form virtual missions that make it possible to address science questions that are beyond the scope of an individual expedition.

Legacy expeditions 

The JOIDES Resolution has been conducting scientific ocean drilling expeditions since 1985. During the Ocean Drilling Program (1985–2003), the JR conducted 111 expeditions and drilled 669 sites. During the Integrated Ocean Drilling Program (2003–2013), the JR conducted 35 expeditions and drilled 145 sites. Highlights of Ocean Drilling Program and Integrated Ocean Drilling Program expeditions can be found in the final technical reports for those programs (see References). Monitoring of boreholes began with the installation of a broadband seismometer in Hole 794D in 1989 during the Ocean Drilling Program. Subsequently, more than 30 long-term borehole observatories ranging from simple to complex have been installed.

Coring statistics 

Detailed JOIDES Resolution coring statistics by program are available online (see External links). The following tables include overall statistics and highlights.

Note: *Data is updated through January 2018.

Note: *Data is updated through January 2018.

JOIDES Resolution outreach 

The JOIDES Resolution is used as a platform for education and outreach. Onboard Education/Outreach Officers sail on each expedition, and JRSO personnel are available to assist with ship-to-shore video conferencing, port call tours, and outreach efforts. The inaugural School of Rock workshop (Hands-on Research Experiences for Earth and Ocean Science Educators) was held on board the JR in 2005, and the ship continues to be used for School of Rock workshops when it is available on transits or during maintenance periods.

See also
Deep Sea Drilling Project
Ocean Drilling Program
Integrated Ocean Drilling Program
International Ocean Discovery Program

References

Bickle, M., Arculus, R., Barrett, P., DeConto, R., Camoin, G., Edwards, K., Fisher, F., Inagaki, F., Kodaira, S., Ohkouchi, N., Pälike, H., Ravelo, C., Saffer, D., and Teagle, D., 2011. Illuminating Earth's Past, Present and Future—The Science Plan for the International Ocean Discovery Program 2013–2023 Washington, DC (Integrated Ocean Drilling Program). 
Consortium for Ocean Leadership, 2007. Bigger, better U.S. scientific ocean drilling ship for Integrated Ocean Drilling Program. 
Humphris, S.E., and Koppers, A.A.P., 2013. Planning for future ocean drilling with the JOIDES Resolution. Eos, Transactions of the American Geophysical Union, 94(26):229–230. 
Integrated Ocean Drilling Program U.S. Implementing Office, 2014. Final Technical Report: U.S. Implementing Organization. 
Koppers, A., Coggon, R., et al., 2020. 2050 Science Framework: Exploring Earth by Scientific Ocean Drilling.
NSF, 2009. U.S. scientific ocean drilling vessel sets sail for science sea trials. News Release 09-009. 
Ocean Drilling Program, 2007. Ocean Drilling Program Final Technical Report 1983–2007.

External links

 JOIDES Resolution, MarineTraffic. Accessed 2 February 2023.
 In Search of Earth's Secrets pop-up/drill-down traveling exhibit
 IODP JRSO information by expedition
 IODP expedition schedule for the JOIDES Resolution
 JOIDES Resolution daily reports, weekly reports, and site summaries
 JOIDES Resolution history and drilling highlights
 JOIDES Resolution vessel tour
 JOIDES Resolution drill ship (old official website)
 JOIDES Resolution Science Operator (official website)
 JOIDES Resolution coring statistics
 education website
 JOIDES Resolution outreach: School of Rock
 IODP publications
 Legacy long-range planning reports
 ODP legacy website

Research vessels of the United States
Drillships